Mericoceras is an extinct nautiloid cephalopod that lived during the Late Devonian and possible as early as the Silurian.

Taxonomy
Mericoceras is included in the Orthocerida, an order of cephalopods.

Fossil distribution
Fossil distribution is exclusive to Sardinia, Wisconsin USA, and northern Ontario, Canada.

References
Mericoceras entry on the Paleobiology Database 7/9/12 
 Jack Sepkoski's lists of Cephalopod genera 
 Walter C. Sweet, 1964. Nautiloidea-Orthocerida. Treatise on Invertebrate Paleontology, Part K. Geological Society of America and University of Kansas Press. 

Prehistoric nautiloid genera
Silurian animals
Devonian cephalopods
Devonian animals of Europe
Silurian first appearances
Devonian extinctions